In male anatomy, the lacuna magna (also called Guérin's sinus) is the largest of several recesses in the roof of the navicular fossa of the male urethra.

Structure 
The lacuna magna is a large recess in the roof of the navicular fossa of the male urethra.

Development 
The embryological origin of the lacuna magna is contested. However, recent evidence suggests it and the navicular fossa of the male urethra derive from infiltrating endodermal cells of the urethral plate.

Clinical significance 
In young males, the presence of the lacuna magna is associated with painful urination (dysuria), bloody urine (hematuria), and bloody spotting of underwear.

References

Urinary system
Human penis anatomy
Male urethra